The Persistence of Memory is a novel by Tony Eprile. It was published in 2004 by W. W. Norton & Company. The story portrays 1960s and 1970s South Africa through the experiences of Paul Sweetbread, a young Jewish South African  with a photographic memory. The novel follows Paul from his experiences in school, through his service in the South African Defence Force during the country's border war, to his participation in the Truth and Reconciliation Commission. The novel deals heavily with the question of white liberal guilt during the apartheid regime.

Reception
The New York Times described the book as "a fascinating picture of white South Africa, an anatomy of the liberal conscience -- both sympathetic and scathing -- that resonates far beyond its immediate setting".

Awards

The Persistence of Memory won the 2005 Koret Jewish Book Award for fiction.

References

2004 American novels
Apartheid novels
Novels set during the South African Border War
21st-century South African novels
American historical novels
Novels set in South Africa
W. W. Norton & Company books